Ted F. Keck (August 4, 1919 – November 11, 2010) was an American football player and coach. He served as the head football coach (1954–1956) and baseball coach (1957–1963) at Minot State University before serving as the athletic director at Northern Arizona University in Flagstaff, Arizona, from 1963 to 1970.

Head coaching record

Football

References

1919 births
2010 deaths
Minot State Beavers athletic directors
Minot State Beavers baseball coaches
Minot State Beavers football coaches
Minot State Beavers football players
Northern Arizona Lumberjacks athletic directors
College wrestling coaches in the United States
People from McLean County, North Dakota
Players of American football from North Dakota